MacFarlane Bluff is a bluff reaching to over  in the All-Blacks Nunataks, west of the Churchill Mountains of Antarctica. It was named in honor of Malcolm MacFarlane, who worked at Vanda Station, Scott Base and in the Department of Scientific and Industrial Research Antarctic Division, the New Zealand Antarctic Programme and for Antarctica New Zealand between 1983 and 1996.

References

Cliffs of Oates Land